Liberdade (liberty) is the name of a district in the subprefecture of Sé, in São Paulo, Brazil. By various estimates, it is home to the world's largest ethnic Japanese community outside Japan.

History
Liberdade was known as Campo da Forca (Field of the Gallows) until the late 19th century, and was an area reserved for the execution of slaves and convicts. Death was considered the only path to liberty (liberdade) for slaves. The condemned were led to the Igreja Nossa Senhora da Boa Morte (Church of Our Lady of Good Death) to perform a final prayer for a rapid and painless death. The church remains on Rua do Carmo at the corner of Rua Tabatinguera. Slaves and other convicts were executed in the Largo da Forca (Gallows Square), the public square now known as Praça da Liberdade. Cemitério dos Aflitos (Cemetery of the Afflicted) was created in 1774 to bury executed slaves, those who had committed suicide, and others who could not be interred elsewhere. The cemetery was replaced by housing development in the 20th century, and the simple Capela dos Aflitos on Rua dos Estudantes is a remnant of the era. Igreja da Santa Cruz das Almas dos Enforcados (Church of Santa Cruz of the Souls of the Hanged), prominently located to the south of the public square, commemorates the dead of Campo da Forca. Executions were carried out in Campo da Forca until 1891, and the square was renamed Liberdade.

The Japanese presence in the neighborhood began in 1912. One of the reasons for this was that almost every property had a basement, and the rents were incredibly cheap. In these rooms groups of people lived. Being a central neighborhood, from there they could easily get around to workplaces. By this time, commercial activities began to emerge: a hostel, a market, a house that made tofu, another that made manjū (a Japanese confection), and also job-creating firms, thus resulting in the label of "the Japanese street". In 1915, the Taisho Shogakko (Taisho Primary School) was founded, which helped educate the children of Japanese immigrants, then approximately 300 people. In 1932, there were about 2,000 Japanese people in the city of São Paulo. They came directly from Japan and also from the interior of São Paulo, after concluding their work contracts on plantations, in search of an opportunity in the city. They worked in more than 60 activities, but almost all the establishments worked to serve the Japanese Brazilian collective. 1946 saw the founding of the São Paulo Shimbun newspaper, the first postwar periodical among Nikkei (Japanese immigrants), as well as the inauguration of the still operating Sol Bookstore (Taiyodo), where Japanese books imported through the United States can be found. The Tunibra travel agency began holding events in the same year. In March 1947, an orchestra formed by Professor Masahiko Maruyama performed the first post-war concert, in the Auditorium of the Paulista Teacher's Center on Avenida Liberdade. In 1953, Yoshikazu Tanaka inaugurated a 5-story building on Rua Galvão Bueno, with a hall, restaurant, hotel and a large projection room on the ground floor with room for an audience of 1,500 named Cine Niterói, which grew to rival other Japanese-operated theaters in the region. In April 1964, the Japanese Cultural Association of São Paulo (Bunkyô) building was inaugurated. In the decade of 1970 the subway station of Liberdade was constructed, altering the urban composition of the region. On January 28, 1974, the Association of Shopkeepers Association officially became the Association of Shopkeepers of Liberdade. Its first president, Tsuyoshi Mizumoto, sought the characterization of the eastern district.

Overview
Significant populations of Chinese, Taiwanese and Koreans also live in the district of Liberdade.

Since 1974 the entrance to Liberdade has been marked by a nine-meter tall red torii (a characteristic arch marking the entrance to Shinto Shrines).  This towering structure, situated on Rua Galvão Bueno, is a distinctive representation of the neighborhood.  Liberdade was successfully connected to the São Paulo subway network in the 1970s, opening the area up to commerce.  Today, thousands of Paulistanos (citizens of São Paulo) flock to the public square in Liberdade every Sunday to purchase craft goods at the weekly fair. In January 2008, in order to celebrate 100 years of Japanese immigration to Brazil, a project to revitalize the quarter was approved by the mayor Gilberto Kassab. 40% of the restoration was for the visit of Crown Prince Naruhito to São Paulo in June 2008.

The Japanese presence in the neighborhood began in 1912.  At this time, Japanese immigrants began to take up residence on the Rua Conde de Sarzedas.  This street had a steep slope that gave way to a running stream and swamp area. Basement apartments were numerous and inexpensive, and groups of people or families often lived together in the small rooms.  However, the central location of the neighborhood meant immigrants could also be closer to work. As the number of immigrants in the neighborhood grew, so did commercial activity.  Soon Japanese-owned inns, emporiums, restaurants, shops, and markets were popping up. These new commercial endeavors also become workplaces, which brought more immigrants to the area, and thus the "street of the Japanese" was formed.

Liberdade is a meeting spot for many groups, especially among young people who are interested in Japanese culture.  Manga (Japanese comics) fans, sometimes participating in  cosplay, can be seen in the district almost any day of the week, especially on weekends. The district is also a popular tourist destination. People from all over the world, as well as from Brazil itself, are often seen mixing with Japanese housewives doing their grocery shopping on Galvão Bueno Street and businessmen looking for low priced Asian food for lunch. Also famous in the district is the Liberdade street market that occurs each Saturday and Sunday, which offers tastes of traditional Japanese food and various household goods and souvenirs. This well-known event attracts so many people from outside the district that the event is predominantly non-Asian.

Media
The now defunct Japanese newspaper São Paulo Shimbun was published in Liberdade.

The Japanese newspaper Nikkey Shimbun and its sister Portuguese paper the Jornal Nippak are published in Liberdade.

Culture and recreation
The Museu Histórico da Imigração Japonesa no Brasil (ブラジル日本移民史料館) is located in Liberdade.

Access
Liberdade is served by the São Paulo Metro (Japão-Liberdade Station), a station on Line 1 (Blue). The station opened in 1975 and receives 21,000 passengers per day. Access to the station is via Praça da Liberdade.

Gallery

See also
 Japanese community of São Paulo

References

Asian-Brazilian culture in São Paulo
Ethnic enclaves in South America
Japanese-Brazilian culture
Japantowns
Districts of São Paulo
Tourist attractions in São Paulo